During the month of December 2020, a series of targeted killings were carried out in Afghanistan. While several assassinations happened in Afghanistan in the last 20 years, targeted killings increased during this month. The Islamic State of Iraq and the Levant – Khorasan Province claimed responsibility for two of those attacks and is suspected to be behind the others. The Taliban denied their involvement in the killings.

Timeline of the attacks

References

Targeted killing in Afghanistan
2020 in Kabul
2020 mass shootings in Asia
November attacks
2020s crimes in Kabul
November 2020 attacks
21st century in Ghazni Province
2020s in Kabul
November 2020 attacks
Crime in Ghazni Province
Crime in Kabul
Improvised explosive device bombings in 2020
December 2020 attacks
ISIL terrorist incidents in Afghanistan
Mass murder in 2020
Mass murder in Kabul
Mass shootings in Kabul
December 2020 crimes in Asia